Under UNESCO’s Man and the Biosphere Programme, there are 302 biosphere reserves recognized as part of the World Network of Biosphere Reserves in Europe and North America (as of April 2016). These are distributed across 36 countries in the region.

Biosphere reserves operating under the UNESCO Man and the Biosphere Programme aim to achieve three mandate management objectives of conservation, sustainable socio-economic development, and logistic support.

The list 
Below is the list of biosphere reserves in Europe and North America, organized by country/territory, along with the year these were designated as part of the World Network of Biosphere Reserves.

The list does not include the Intercontinental Biosphere Reserve of the Mediterranean, a biosphere reserve shared between Morocco and Spain, which has been classified as part of the Arab States region.

Albania
 Ohrid-Prespa (2014) (shared with North Macedonia)

Austria
 (Gossenköllesee (1977) - withdrawn in 2014)
 (Gurgler Kamm (1977) - withdrawn in 2014)
 (Lobau (1977) - withdrawn in 2016)
 (Neusiedler See (1977) - withdrawn in 2016)
 Großwalsertal (since 2000)
 Wienerwald (since 2005)
 Salzburger Lungau & Kärntner Nockberge (since 2012)

Belarus
 Berezinsky Biosphere Reserve (1978)
 Belovezhskaya Pushcha (1993)
 West Polesie Transboundary Biosphere Reserve  (2004)

Bulgaria
 ( (1977, withdrawn in 2017)
 (Kamtchia (1977, withdrawn in 2017))
 ( (1977, withdrawn in 2017))
 (Steneto (1977, merged in 2017))
 (Boatin (1977, merged in 2017))
 (Tsarichina (1977, merged in 2017))
 (Dzhendema (1977, merged in 2017))
 Ali Botush (1977)
 Bistrishko Branishte (1977)
 Bayuvi Dupki–Dzhindzhiritsa  (1977) (in Pirin National Park)
 Mantaritza (1977)
 Uzunbodzhak (1977)
 Parangalitsa (1977) (in Rila National Park)
 Srebarna (1977)
  (1977)
 Chuprene (1977)
 Central Balkan National Park (created in 2017 by merging four extant reserves)

Canada
 Mont Saint-Hilaire (1978)
 Waterton (1979)
 Long Point (1986)
 Riding Mountain (1986)
 Charlevoix (1988)
 Niagara Escarpment (1990)
 Clayoquot Sound (2000)
 Redberry Lake (2000)
 Lac Saint-Pierre (2000)
 Mount Arrowsmith (2000)
 Southwest Nova (2001)
 Frontenac Arch (2002)
 Georgian Bay (2004)
 Manicouagan Uapishka (2007)
 Fundy (2007)
 Bras d'Or Lake (2011)
 Beaver Hills (2016)
 Tsá Tué (2016)
 Howe Sound (2021)

Croatia
 Velebit Mountain (1977)
 Mura Drava Danube (2012)

Czech Republic
 Krivoklátsko (1977)
 Trebon Basin (1977)
 Sumava (1990)
 Bílé Karpaty (1996)
 Lower Morava (2003)

Czech Republic and Poland
 Krkonose / Karkonosze (1992)

Denmark
 North-East Greenland (1977)
 Møn (2017)

Estonia
 West Estonian Archipelago (1990)

Finland
 North Karelian (1992)
 Petkeljärvi National Park
 Patvinsuo National Park
 Archipelago Sea Area (1994)

France
 Commune de Fakarava (1977)
 Vallée du Fango (1977)
 Camargue (Rhône River Delta) (1977)
 Cévennes (1984)
 Iroise (1988)
 Mont Ventoux (1990)
 Archipel de la Guadeloupe (1992)
 Luberon (1997)
 Forest of Fontainebleau (1998)
 Dordogne Watershed (2012)
 Marais Audomarois (2013)
 Gorges du Gardon (2015)

France and Germany
 Palatinate Forest–North Vosges (1998)

France and Italy
 Monte Viso (2014)

Germany
 Middle Elbe (1979)
 Vessertal-Thuringian Forest (1979)
 Bavarian Forest (1981)
 Berchtesgaden Alps (1990)
 Wadden Sea and Hallig Islands of Schleswig-Holstein (1990)
 Schorfheide-Chorin (1990)
 Spreewald (1991)
 Rügen (1991)
 Rhön (1991)
 Lower Saxon Wadden Sea (1992)
 Hamburg Wadden Sea (1992)
 Upper Lusatian Heath and Pond Landscape (1996)
 Schaalsee (2000)
 Bliesgau (2009)
 Swabian Alb (2009)
 Black Forest (2017)

Greece
 Gorge of Samaria (1981)
 Mount Olympus (1981)

Hungary
 Aggtelek National Park(1979)
 Hortobágy National Park (1979)
 Kiskunság National Park (1979)
 Pilis (1980)
 Fertő-Hanság National Park (1991) UNESCO Biosphere Reserve since 1979

Ireland
 North Bull Island (1981)
 Killarney (1982)

Isle of Man
 Isle of Man (2016) - entire territory and territorial seas

Israel
 Mount Carmel (1996)
 Megiddo (2011; formerly "Ramat Menashe")

Italy
 Collemeluccio-Montedimezzo (1977)
 Circeo (1977)
 Miramare (1979)
 Cilento and Vallo di Diano (1997)
 Somma-Vesuvio and Miglio d'Oro (1997)
 Valle del Ticino (2002), then Ticino Val Grande Verbano (2018)
 Tuscan Islands (2003)
 Selva Pisana (2004)
 Monviso (2013)
 Sila (2014)
 Tepilora, Rio Posada and Montalbo (2017)
 Monte Peglia (2018)
 Valle Camonica - Alto Sebino	(2018)

Latvia
 North Vidzeme (1997)

Lithuania
 Žuvintas (2002)

Montenegro
 Tara River Basin (1976)

Netherlands
 Waddensea Area (1986, withdrawn 2018)*
 Maasheggen (2018)

North Macedonia
 Ohrid-Prespa (2014) (shared with Albania)

Poland

 Babia Góra Massif (1976)
 Białowieża Forest (1976)
 Łuknajno Lake (1976)
 Słowiński (1976)
 Tatra Mountains (1992) (Cross-border with Slovakia)
 Karkonosze (1992) (shared with the Czech Republic)
 East Carpathian (1998) (Cross-border with Slovakia and Ukraine)
 Kampinos Forest (2000)
 West Polesie (2002) (Cross-border with Ukraine and Belarus) (2012)
 Tuchola Forest (2010)

Portugal
 Paúl do Boquilobo (1981)
 Corvo Island (2007)
 Graciosa Island (2007)
 Flores Island (2009)
 Castro Verde (2017)

Portugal and Spain
 Geres/Xures (2009)
 Meseta Ibérica (2015)

Romania
 Pietrosul Mare (1979)
 Retezat (1979)

Romania and Ukraine
 Danube Delta (1998)

Russian Federation
 Kavkazskiy (1978)
 Okskiy (1978)
 Prioksko-Terrasnyi (1978)
 Sikhote-Alin (1978)
 Tsentral'no-Chernozemny (1978)
 Nevski Prospekhetee (1984)
 Kronotskiy (1984)
 Laplandskiy (1984)
 Pechoro-Ilychskiy (1984)
 Sayano-Shushenskiy (1984)
 Sokhondinskiy (1984)
 Voronezhskiy (1984)
 Tsentral'nolesnoy (1985)
 Barguzinskyi (1986)
 Baikalskyi (1986)
 Tzentralnosibirskii (1986)
 Chernyje Zemli (1993)
 Taimyrsky (1995)
 Ubsunorskaya Kotlovina (1997)
 Daursky (1997)
 Teberda (1997)
 Katunsky (2000)
 Nerusso-Desnianskoe-Polesie (2001)
 Visimskiy (2001)
 Vodolozerskiy (2001)
 Commander Islands (2002)
 Darvinskiy (2002)
 Nijegorodskoe Zavolje (2002)
 Smolensk Lakeland (2002)
 Ugra (2002)
 Far East Marine (2003)
 Kedrovaya Pad (2004)
 Kenozerskiy (2004)
 Valdaisky (2004)
 Khankaiskiy (2005)
 Middle Volga Integrated Biosphere Reserve (2006)
 Great Volzhsko-Kamsky (2007)
 Rostovsky (2008)
 Altaisky (2009)
 Kizlyar Bay (2017)
 Metsola (2017)
 Great Altai (2017)(encompassing Katun Nature Reserve in Russia and Katon-Karagay National Park in Kazakhstan)

Serbia
 Golija-Studenica (2001)
 Bačko Podunavlje (2017)

Slovakia
 Slovenský Kras (1977)
 Poľana (1990)
 Tatra Mountains (1992) (Cross-border with Poland)
 East Carpathian (1998) (Cross-border with Slovakia and Ukraine)

Slovenia
 Julian Alps (2003)
 The Karst (2004)
Kozjansko & Obsotelje (2010)
 Mura River (2018)

Spain

 Grazalema (1977)
 Ordesa-Viñamala (1977)
 Montseny Natural Park (1978)
 Doñana (1980)
 Mancha Húmeda (1980)
 Las Sierras de Cazorla y Segura (1983)
 Marismas del Odiel (1983)
 La Palma (1983)
 Urdaibai (1984)
 Sierra Nevada (1986)
 Cuenca Alta del Río Manzanares (1992)
 Lanzarote (1993)
 Menorca (1993)
 Sierra de las Nieves y su Entomo (1995)
 Cabo de Gata-Nijar (1997)
 Isla de El Hierro (2000)
 Bardenas Reales (2000)
 Muniellos, Gran Cantábrica (2000)
 Somiedo (2000)
 Redes (2001)
 Las Dehesas de Sierra Morena (2002)
 Terras do Miño (2002)
 Valle de Laciana (2003)
 Picos de Europa (2003)
 Monfragüe (2003)
 Valles del Jubera, Leza, Cidacos y Alhama (2003)
 Babia (2004)
 Alto de Bernesga (2005)
 Los Valles de Omaña y Luna (2005)
 Los Argüellos (2005)
 Área de Allariz (2005)
 Gran Canaria (2005)
 Sierra del Rincón (2005)
 Os Ancares Lucenses e Montes de Cervantes (2006)
 Los Ancares Leoneses (2006)
 Las Sierras de Béjar y Francia (2006)
 Río Eo, Oscos e Terras de Buron (2007)
 Fuerteventura (2009)
 As Mariñas Coruñesas e Terras do Mandeo (2013)
 Terres de l'Ebre (2013)
 Real Sitio de San Ildefonso-El Espinar (2013)
 Macizo de Anaga (2015)
 Ponga (2018)

Sweden
 (Lake Torne Area (1986) - withdrawn in 2010)
 Kristianstads Vattenrike Biosphere Reserve (2005)
 Lake Vänern Archipelago (2010)
 Blekinge archipelago (2011)
 River Landscape of Nedre Dalälven (2011)
 East Vättern Scarp Landscape (2012)
 Voxnadalen (2019)
 Vindelälven-Juhttátahkka (2019)

Switzerland

 Swiss National Park (1979)
 Entlebuch Biosphere (2001)
 Biosfera Val Müstair (2010)

Turkey
 Camili (2005)

Ukraine

 Chernomorskiy (1984)
 Askaniya-Nova (1985)
 Carpathian (1992)
 East Carpathian (1998) (Cross-border with Slovakia and Ukraine)
 Shatskiy (2002)
 Desnianskyi (2009)
 Roztochya (2011)

United Kingdom
 Beinn Eighe (1976)
 Braunton Burrows (1976), extended 2002 as North Devon's Biosphere Reserve
 Cairnsmore of Fleet (1976)
 Biosffer Dyfi (1976)
 (Loch Druidibeg (1976) - withdrawn 2013)
 (Moor House-Upper Teesdale (1976) - withdrawn 2012)
 (North Norfolk Coast (1976) - withdrawn 2014)
 Silver Flowe-Merrick Kells (1976)
 (Taynish (1977) - withdrawn 2010)
 Galloway and southern Ayrshire (2012)
 Brighton and Lewes Downs (2014)
 Wester Ross (2016)

United States
 Big Bend (1976)
 Cascade Head (1976)
 Channel Islands (1976)
 Denali (1976)
 Everglades & Dry Tortugas (1976)
 Glacier (1976)
 Jornada (1976)
 Luquillo (1976)
 Olympic (1976)
 Organ Pipe Cactus (1976)
 Rocky Mountain (1976)
 San Joaquin (1976)
 Sequoia-Kings Canyon (1976)
 Yellowstone (1976)
 University of Michigan Biological Station (1979)
 Virginia Coast (1979)
 Hawaiian Islands (1980)
 Isle Royale (1980)
 Big Thicket (1981)
 Guanica (1981)
 Central Gulf Coast Plain (1983)
 South Atlantic Coastal Plain (1983)
 Mojave and Colorado Deserts (1984)
 Glacier Bay-Admiralty Island (1986)
 Golden Gate (1988)
 New Jersey Pinelands (1988)
 Southern Appalachian (1988)
 Champlain-Adirondak (1989)
 Mammoth Cave Area (1990)
Sites withdrawn in 2017 by request of the U.S. government
 (Aleutian Islands (1976–2017))
 (Beaver Creek (1976–2017))
 (California Coast Ranges (1983–2017))
 (Carolinian-South Atlantic (1986–2017))
 (Central Plains (1976–2017))
 (Coram (1976–2017))
 (Desert (1976–2017))
 (Fraser (1976–2017))
 (H.J. Andrews (1976–2017))
 (Hubbard Brook (1976–2017))
 (Konza Prairie (1978))
 (Land Between the Lakes (1991–2017))
 (Niwot Ridge (1979–2017))
 (Noatak (1976–2017))
 (Stanislaus-Tuolumne (1976–2017))
 (Three Sisters (1976–2017))
 (Virgin Islands (1976–2017))
Sites withdrawn in 2018
 San Dimas (1976–2018)

References

Further reading 
 International Journal of UNESCO Biosphere Reserves. eISSN 2371-7890. Some contents archived at

External links
 List of UNESCO World Network of Biosphere Reserves of Europe and North America

+